Seifer is a surname, sometimes used as a given name.

People with this name
Eugénie Seifer Olson, American author 
Marc Seifer (born 1948), American author and professor of psychology
Reed Seifer (born 1973), American artist

Fictional characters
Seifer Almasy in the video game Final Fantasy VIII

See also
sefer, Hebrew word for book
Seifert, German surname
Siefert, a similar surname